is a Japanese game producer, director, and general manager from Bandai Namco Entertainment, best known as the former producer (now Michael Murray ) and current director of the popular fighting game series Tekken.

Biography 

Harada was born in Osaka, Japan, and grew up within the Nara Prefecture region. He later moved to Tokyo, Japan. During his childhood, video games were viewed with a great deal of suspicion in Japan. His parents would not buy him a home console, and as a result often sneaked into arcade centres, where he would occasionally be discovered and dragged out. He worked hard and ended up securing a place at Waseda University. He has studied judo, karate and a little bit of taekwondo in the past. He attended Waseda University along with Dead or Alive creator Tomonobu Itagaki and holds a degree in psychology. During his university studies, he took a few Chinese language courses, albeit finding it very difficult. After graduating from university, he joined Namco to become a promoter. His parents were initially unhappy with his pursuit in a career with the video game industry, but have since accepted him in his work.

During his first year working in the Namco arcade, Harada smashed the sales record two months in a row, and subsequently received an award of commendation from the president of Namco. Thanks to the award, Harada now had a platform to approach the management and request that they move him into game development. Towards the end of the first year at Namco, they gave him a position on the first Tekken title.

He voiced Forest Law in Tekken 3 and Tekken Tag Tournament, Marshall Law from Tekken until Tekken 5: Dark Resurrection, Yoshimitsu from Tekken until Tekken Tag Tournament and Kunimitsu in Tekken. He is known within the fanbase for his sense of humor, such as his comical rivalry with former Street Fighter director (he was director from 1998-2020), Yoshinori Ono, jokes around the character Leo in Tekken 6 because of the ambiguous gender, and for attending EVO 2017 in a shirt that read "Don't Ask Me for Shit". Harada is also a member of Project Soul (the team behind the Soulcalibur franchise) and makes an appearance in Soulcalibur V as a bonus character.

By 2019, Harada had been promoted to lead the fighting game esports division of Bandai Namco, as well as to being a general manager at the company overall.

Works

References

External links 

 Katsuhiro Harada on Twitter
 

1970 births
Japanese male video game actors
Japanese male voice actors
Japanese video game directors
Japanese video game programmers
Living people
People from Osaka
People from Nara Prefecture
20th-century Japanese male actors
21st-century Japanese male actors